Friends of Mine is an album by American folk musician Ramblin' Jack Elliott, released in 1998.

Guests include Nanci Griffith, Emmylou Harris, Arlo Guthrie, Jerry Jeff Walker, John Prine, and Tom Waits.

Reception

Writing for Allmusic, music critic Thom Owens wrote the album "is a thoroughly enjoyable collection of duets (and one trio) produced by Roy Rogers. There's a loose, intimate atmosphere on Friends of Mine that is instantly appealing, and his selection of singing partners... It's an excellent latter-day effort from Elliott that confirms his status as a legendary folksinger."

Track listing 
"Ridin' Down the Canyon" (duet with Arlo Guthrie) (Gene Autry, Smiley Burnette) – 4:24  
"Me and Billy the Kid" (duet with Peter Rowan) (Joe Ely) – 3:50  
"Last Letter" (duet with Rosalie Sorrels)(Rex Griffin) – 5:06  
"Louise" (duet with Tom Waits)(Tom Waits, Kathleen Brennan) – 4:44  
"Rex's Blues" (with Nanci Griffith and Emmylou Harris) (Townes Van Zandt) – 2:36  
"Walls of Red Wing" (duet with John Prine) (Bob Dylan) – 4:31  
"Hard Travelin'" (duet with Jerry Jeff Walker)(Woody Guthrie) – 2:46  
"He Was a Friend of Mine" (duet with Jerry Jeff Walker)(traditional) – 3:25  
"Dark as a Dungeon" (duet with Guy Clark) (Merle Travis) – 4:43  
"Friend of the Devil" (duet with Bob Weir) (Jerry Garcia, Robert Hunter, John Dawson) – 4:14  
"Reason to Believe" (Tim Hardin) – 3:25  
"Bleeker Street Blues" (Jack Elliott) – 3:51  
"Old Time Feeling" (with Tom Waits and Guy Clark) (Guy Clark) - 0:45

Personnel
Ramblin' Jack Elliott – vocals, guitar
Bob Weir – vocals, guitar
Norton Buffalo – harmonica  
Ruth Davies – bass
 Guy Clark- vocals  
Nanci Griffith – guitar, vocals  
Arlo Guthrie – guitar, vocals  
Emmylou Harris – vocals
John Prine – guitar, vocals  
Tom Rigney – violin  
Peter Rowan – guitar, mandolin, vocals  
Rosalie Sorrels – vocals  
Tom Waits – vocals, guitar
Jerry Jeff Walker – vocals, guitar, harmonica
Billy Wilson – accordion  
 
Production notes:
Roy Rogers – producer
Mooka Rennick – engineer
Robert Geller – assistant engineer
Scotty Johnson – assistant engineer
Cindy Pascarello – design
Gaynell Toler Rogers – photography
Chris Felver – photography

References

External links
The Rambler • Jack Elliott lives up to his nickname — except when the conversation turns to music

1998 albums
Ramblin' Jack Elliott albums
HighTone Records albums